Michael Vincent Lawler (born September 9, 1986) is an American politician serving as the U.S. representative for New York's 17th congressional district since 2023. From 2021 to 2022, he was a Republican member of the New York State Assembly from the 97th district in Rockland County.

Early life and education 
A native of Rockland County, Lawler graduated from Suffern High School. He earned his Bachelor of Science degree in accounting and finance from Manhattan College. Lawler was named valedictorian of his graduating class.

Career 
Lawler is a partner at the political communications firm Checkmate Strategies. He previously worked in the Westchester County Executive's Office as an advisor to Rob Astorino and executive director of the New York State Republican Party. Before winning his election, he served as deputy town supervisor of Orangetown, New York, working with Teresa Kenny, town supervisor.

Lawler was elected to the New York State Assembly in 2020 for a two-year term. He ran against incumbent Ellen Jaffee and won the general election.

U.S. House of Representatives

Elections

2022 

Lawler was the Republican nominee in the 2022 general election in New York's 17th congressional district, having won the August 2022 primary. He defeated Democratic incumbent and DCCC chair Sean Patrick Maloney in the November general election.

Committee assignments
 Committee on Financial Services
 Committee on Foreign Affairs

Tenure
On January 4, 2023, Lawler reserved judgment on his colleague George Santos after numerous discrepancies in Santos's resume came to light. Lawler said on CNN, "His election has been certified so he will be seated in this Congress, but ultimately, obviously, we will see what the investigations come back with." On January 12, 2023, he called for Santos to resign.

Lawler voted for Kevin McCarthy in the 2023 Speaker of the United States House of Representatives election. McCarthy was unable to win the speakership on the first 14 ballots. Lawler said of the matter, "It's time for everybody to unify. It's time for everybody to move forward because the reality is the American people didn't elect us to fight over rules."

On January 9, Lawler voted in favor of the House rules package. Afterward, he gave his first House speech, in favor of a bill that would defund the IRS of the money allocated in the Inflation Reduction Act.

On January 19, Lawler and Representative Josh Gottheimer reintroduced the Anti-Congestion Tax Act, a bill to stop the MTA's attempt to institute congestion pricing. Lawler said, "For too long, Hudson Valley commuters have gotten the short end of the stick. With reduced service, no one-seat ride for Rockland County residents, and subways that have become increasingly dangerous, it's no wonder that ridership is down as more folks commute into the city by car or by telecommuting. Which is why congestion pricing, a ludicrous tax grab by the country's most mismanaged authority, should be stopped dead in its tracks."

Lawler voted to remove Ilhan Omar from the Committee on Foreign Affairs.

Political positions

Abortion 
Lawler opposes abortion rights except in cases of rape or incest or if the mother's life is at risk. He also opposes a federal ban on abortion.

Personal life 
Lawler lives in Pearl River with his Romanian-born wife, Doina. They have a daughter who was born in the spring of 2022.

Lawler is Roman Catholic.

Electoral history

References

External links
 Congressman Mike Lawler official U.S. House website
 Campaign website

 
 State assembly website

|-

 
|-

 

1986 births
21st-century American politicians
American Roman Catholics
Catholics from New York (state)
Living people
Manhattan College alumni
People from Suffern, New York
Republican Party members of the New York State Assembly
Republican Party members of the United States House of Representatives from New York (state)